Patrick Lavoie (born October 19, 1987) is a Canadian football fullback for the Toronto Argonauts of the Canadian Football League (CFL). He played in parts of three seasons for the Montreal Alouettes and for four years with the Ottawa Redblacks where he won his first Grey Cup championship in 2016. He has also played for the Saskatchewan Roughriders. He played CIS football for the Laval Rouge et Or and won Vanier Cup championships in 2008 and 2010.

Professional career

Montreal Alouettes 
Lavoie was drafted 11th overall by the Montreal Alouettes in the 2012 CFL Draft and signed with the team on May 16, 2012 to a two-year contract. He scored his first touchdown on July 6, 2012 against the Winnipeg Blue Bombers. He finished his first season with 33 catches for 307 yards and four touchdowns and was the Alouettes nominee for the CFL's Most Outstanding Rookie Award. After the season, on December 4, 2012, he signed a new, three-year deal that would keep him under contract through 2015. He had a reduced role in 2013 due to injuries as the team also underwent head coaching changes where he only played in 14 games and had six receptions for 46 yards.

Ottawa Redblacks 
On December 16, 2013, Lavoie was selected by the expansion Ottawa Redblacks in the 2013 CFL Expansion Draft. He played in 69 games over four years for the Redblacks as the team's primary fullback, recording 86 catches for 796 yards and three touchdowns. He also had a touchdown catch in each of the Redblacks' Grey Cup appearances in a 2015 loss and a 2016 win. He had signed a contract extension prior to the 2016 CFL season that kept him under contract through the 2018 CFL season.

Montreal Alouettes (II) 
On January 30, 2018, Lavoie was traded to the Montreal Alouettes in exchange for fellow national fullback J.C. Beaulieu. In his second stint with the Alouettes, he played in 15 games and recorded 13 receptions for 115 yards.

Saskatchewan Roughriders
On October 10, 2018, Lavoie was traded to the Saskatchewan Roughriders. He played in the last three games of the regular season where he had 10 receptions for 79 yards and also played in the West Semi-Final loss to the Winnipeg Blue Bombers where he had one catch for two yards. He signed a two-year contract extension with the team on December 17, 2018. However, he spent the entire 2019 regular season on the injured list due to a back injury and only played in the 2019 West Final where the Roughriders again lost to the Blue Bombers. With the 2020 CFL season cancelled, he did not play in 2020 and became a free agent in 2021.

Toronto Argonauts
On September 14, 2021, it was announced that Lavoie had signed with the Toronto Argonauts.

References

External links
Toronto Argonauts bio
Ottawa Redblacks bio 

1987 births
Living people
Players of Canadian football from Quebec
French Quebecers
Montreal Alouettes players
Ottawa Redblacks players
Saskatchewan Roughriders players
Toronto Argonauts players
Canadian football fullbacks
Laval Rouge et Or football players